Viktor Maksymovych Bannikov (28 April 1938 – 25 April 2001) was a Ukrainian football official and a Soviet player. He was considered one of the best goalkeepers in the Soviet Union earning the title of the best twice in 1964 and 1970. Bannikov had 138 clean sheets earning him a place in the symbolic Lev Yashin club. Distinguished Master of Sport of USSR (1991). He died on the 25 April 2001 and he has buried at the Baikove Cemetery in Baikova St, 6, Kyiv, Ukraine, where also Valeriy Lobanovskyi was buried.

Playing career

Club
Bannikov was born in one of the villages in Zhytomyrschyna, Ukrainian SSR, to ethnic Russian parents. He started his career with Avanhard Zhytomyr. In 1959 Lev Misozhnik, the coach of the local Avanhard Chernihiv football team, was fascinated Victor so much that he gladly agreed to try himself in a new capacity. Finally make a decision in favor of football, according to Viktor Bannikov, he was forced by purely mundane considerations. He made his debut at the age of 20 in the Soviet Second League, an impressive achievement considering many teams still preferred an experienced pair of hands between the sticks. In the mean time the team changed the name to Desna Chernihiv. In 1961 he moved to Kyiv where he spent 8 years of his playing career for Dynamo. During this time he was considered one of the best players, and together with Dynamo he won the championships in 1967 and 1968. Also he was the member of the Soviet national team that took fourth place at the 1966 FIFA World Cup. As the member of the Kyivan club he also was the holder of the Soviet Cup in 1964 and 1966. In 1968, he made a record that never was broken in the Soviet football by goalkeeping for 1122 minutes without conceding a single goal. In 1972 now with Torpedo Moscow he also won the Soviet Cup competition.

International
In his 14 international representations for his country he allowed 13 goals and won only six of them. His first game for USSR national team was on 29 November 1964 against Bulgaria which was ties at nil. The most disastrous game came against Sweden in 1972 where he allowed three(!) goals and was substituted. The game was tied at four, and it was his last game on the international level. Having a great career at the club level, his international record was kind of shaky. His best game for the national team was against Wales at home grounds in 1965 (2–1 win). Bannikov lost only a single game when the national team yielded to Brazil at home in 1965 (0–3).

Professional career and awards
During his playing career, five times he was named to the symbolic dream team (33 of the best) which was picked on an annual basis. At the end of the 1970s he was on the coaching positions for couple of Ukrainian teams. In 1991, he earned the distinguished master of sport of USSR award. He held a title of a distinguished coach of the Ukrainian SSR. From 1991 to 1996 he was the president of the Football Federation of Ukraine and until 2001 he stayed there as the vice-president. He had initiated the first official match for the Ukraine national football team. He had been awarded the Ruby Order of UEFA "For service". He dedicated his whole life to football and particularly to the development of the Ukrainian football.

Honours
Dynamo Kyiv
 Soviet Top League: 1961, 1966, 1967, 1968
 Soviet Cup: 1964, 1965–66

Torpedo Moscow
 Soviet Cup: 1972

USSR national football team
 UEFA European Championship: Runner-up 1972

Individual
 Ukrainian Footballer of the Year: 1964

Tributes
 The football stadium located close to the House of Football and the Olympic Stadium in Kyiv, was named Bannikov Stadium.
 In 1998 the Viktor Bannikov Memorial Tournament was created and received international status and was contested by 16 junior teams.

References

Further reading
 
 Footballfacts.ru
 Short biography 

1938 births
2001 deaths
Soviet footballers
Soviet Union international footballers
1966 FIFA World Cup players
Ukrainian footballers
FC Desna Chernihiv players
FC Dynamo Kyiv players
FC Torpedo Moscow players
Soviet Top League players
Soviet football managers
Ukrainian football managers
FC Polissya Zhytomyr managers
Association football goalkeepers
Football Federation of Ukraine chairmen
Honoured Masters of Sport of the USSR